The Germany national under-21 speedway team is the national under-21 motorcycle speedway team of Germany and is controlled by the Deutscher Motor Sport Bund. The team was started in all editions of Under-21 World Cup. It was started in two finals, but never won a medal. Christian Hefenbrock is the first, and so far, only medalist in Individual competition.

Competition

Team B

See also 
 Germany national speedway team
 Germany national under-19 speedway team

External links 
 (de) Deutscher Motor Sport Bund website

National speedway teams
Speedway
Team